Alise Dzeguze (15 April 1914 – 23 September 1999) was a Latvian figure skater. She competed in the ladies' singles event at the 1936 Winter Olympics.

References

1914 births
1999 deaths
Latvian female single skaters
Olympic figure skaters of Latvia
Figure skaters at the 1936 Winter Olympics
Place of birth missing